Bruce Gamble is an American historian, an author, and United States Military veteran. As a historian, Gamble specializes in World War II in the Pacific, and has written seven books on this particular topic.

Early life and education
Gamble was born on December 7, the anniversary of the Attack on Pearl Harbor. He grew up in Central Pennsylvania. Gamble comes from a family of military aviators. His father was a B-29 pilot in the Pacific and his uncle was a B-17 navigator in New Guinea.

Gamble graduated from Pennsylvania State University in 1980 with a degree in pre-law. Following his graduation, Gamble attended Aviation Officer Candidate School, and was commissioned at Pensacola, Florida. In 1982, he was "winged" as a Naval Flight Officer.

Career
Gamble spent eight years in naval aviation during the Cold War, where he specialized in electronic warfare. For three years he flew as a navigator on EA-3B Skywarriors, logging nearly 1,000 hours. He was deployed aboard aircraft carriers in the Pacific and Indian Oceans. Following this, Gamble returned to Pensacola, where he instructed student naval flight officers in T-47 Citation II jets for two years. In 1988, he was diagnosed with a malignant spinal cord tumor. After undergoing surgery, he medically retired and began using a wheelchair. Gamble has been cancer-free for over twenty years.

Gamble began to volunteer at the National Museum of Naval Aviation after his retirement at the age of 30. He also worked part-time for the Naval Aviation Museum Foundation as the staff historian. During his time there, he collected interviews with aviators and wrote for their magazine, Foundations.

Gamble embarked on a career as a freelance writer. His first book, The Black Sheep, was published in 1998. His books all focus on World War II, specifically in the Pacific region. Three of Gamble's books center on the VMA-214, also known as the "Black Sheep" squadron of World War II. Gamble wrote a biography on Pappy Boyington, a United States Marine Corps fighter ace.  He is the author of the Rabaul trilogy series. Gamble's books have acquired praise from Publishers Weekly and Booklist.

He has been a featured historian on various documentaries produced by History Channel, Fox News Channel, PBS, and Pritzker Military Museum & Library.

Gamble is a lifetime member of the Naval Aviation Museum Foundation and Paralyzed Veterans of America.

Awards
Gamble's book, Fortress Rabaul, won the Gold Medal from the Military Writers Society of America and the "Editor's Choice Award" from Stone & Stone Second World War Books.

In 2010, he received the Admiral Arthur W. Radford award for excellence in naval aviation history and literature, presented by the Naval Aviation Museum Foundation.

In 2013, he won a Florida Book Award.

Published work

 Gamble, Bruce (2018). Kangaroo Squadron: American Courage in the Darkest Days of World War II. Da Capo Press. .

References

External links
Bruce Gamble: Fortress Rabaul: The Battle for the Southwest Pacific, January 1942-April 1943 at Pritzker Military Museum and Library 
Bruce Gamble: Swashbucklers and Black Sheep at Pritzker Military Museum and Library 
Lectures: Bruce Gamble at National WWII Museum, New Orleans
Bruce Gamble pays homage to Jack Kerouac at mustangs.about.com 
Bruce Gamble website

Living people
Historians of World War II
American military historians
American male non-fiction writers
United States Navy officers
Pennsylvania State University alumni
Year of birth missing (living people)